The Baggins End Domes, also known as The Domes or the Davis Domes, are a student housing cooperative at the University of California, Davis built by students in 1972. They are part of the Sustainable Research Area which includes the Student Farm and the Experimental College Gardens. Inspired by Buckminster Fuller, there are 14 domes, featuring painted fiberglass-shell exteriors, the insides of which were coated with sprayed polyurethane foam, and "core-walls" with a kitchen on one side and a bathroom on the other. On January 25, 2011, an announcement was made by Student Housing that no new leases will be granted for the following academic year. The Sustainable Living/ Learning Task Force with faculty and students was initiated to investigate options.

Domes residents, also known as Domies, ended up collaborating with the Solar Community Housing Association (SCHA) cooperative in Davis, California.  SCHA and Domies raised money to repair the domes and lobbied the university to transfer management of the Domes to SCHA.  A community build event was held on November 3–6, where hundreds of volunteers performed the majority of the work, which included creating wheelchair accessible pathways and gardens, building new railings, and patching foam.

SCHA signed a ground lease with UC Davis at the end of December 2011,  14 new Domies moved into 7 of the domes at the start of January. The work was continued through July 2012.

References 

University of California, Davis campus
Houses in Yolo County, California
Residential buildings in California
Student housing cooperatives in the United States